Lunca Banului is a commune in Vaslui County, Western Moldavia, Romania. It is composed of seven villages: Broscoșești, Condrea, Focșa, Lunca Banului, Lunca Veche, Oțetoaia and Răducani.

References

Communes in Vaslui County
Localities in Western Moldavia
Populated places on the Prut